Old Oak Common is an area of Hammersmith, in the London Borough of Hammersmith and Fulham, West London.

Together with neighbouring Park Royal, the area is intended to become the UK's largest regeneration scheme, the scale of which has led to Park Royal and Old Oak Common being described as a potential "Canary Wharf of West London".

The area is traditionally known for its railway depots, particularly Old Oak Common TMD. Further south lies an open area, Wormwood Scrubs Park, and Wormwood Scrubs prison. Willesden Junction station lies to the north of the area.  In the mid-19th century it was a centre for pig farming.

History
Originally, Old Oak Common was a stretch of land defined by what became the Harrow Road at its northern end, and its eastern edge was the northern source of Stamford Brook, forming a boundary with Wormwood Scrubs. By 1801, the Paddington Canal had cut it in half, further reducing its size. With the coming of the railways, most of the common was lost and what remained became part of Wormwood Scrubs.

The Great Western Railway's Great Western Main Line (GWML) of 1838–1841 from London Paddington to Bristol and the 1903 Acton-Northolt line to the Great Western and Great Central Joint Railway at Northolt divided at Old Oak junction.

The partially singled Acton-Northolt line closed in December 2018 to allow for the construction of Old Oak Common railway station, which will offer interchange between GWML trains, the Elizabeth line and the High Speed 2 (HS2) line heading north. Additional rail interchanges may be provided with the construction of two new London Overground stations,  on the West London line and Old Oak Common Lane on the North London line.

In summer 2011, the London Borough of Hammersmith and Fulham launched a wide-ranging 'Park Royal City' plan for Old Oak Common, including the proposed station, and with light-rail lines to the surrounding areas.

Regeneration
In December 2013, The Independent reported that Antony Spencer, founder of Stadium Capital Development, was to head up a £5 billion regeneration scheme in the area, with partner Queens Park Rangers. The proposal included new homes, office, retail outlets, and a proposed football stadium for QPR. The planning application was rejected.

The Old Oak and Park Royal Development Corporation was established in 2015 to lead regeneration and planning work for an area covering Old Oak Common and much of the Park Royal area. The combined redevelopment area is envisaged to provide 65,000 new jobs and 25,000 new homes.

The engineering plans were revealed in 2018 showing a station at Old Oak Common for HS2, the high speed line running from London to Birmingham. Passengers using HS2 will be able to disembark at Old Oak Common and interchange with the Elizabeth line, Chiltern Railways and Great Western Railway services. The station will have a capacity for around 100 million passengers, rivalling London Waterloo in Central London.

References

Areas of London
Districts of the London Borough of Hammersmith and Fulham
Common land in London